Marcel Marius van der Linden (born 9 October 1952) was director of research at the International Institute of Social History until 2014, is now Senior Researcher at the Institute, and also holds a professorship dedicated to the history of social movements at the University of Amsterdam.

Van der Linden was elected the first president of the International Social History Association, founded in Sydney in 2005 with current residency in Amsterdam. He has served as president from 2005-2010, then from 2010-2015, and was again been elected for the period 2015-2020.

Van der Linden is widely recognized in his field for his approach of a "global labour history" which he has developed since the 1990s. Global labour history is seen by many scholars of labour studies as a new paradigm that wants to overcome both traditional labour history and the "new labour history" developed in the 1960s by scholars like Eric Hobsbawm and E.P. Thompson.

Marcel van der Linden received an honorary doctorate from the University of Oslo in 2008. He is also the recipient of the René Kuczynski Prize (Berlin/Vienna 2009), and the Bochumer Historikerpreis (2014),

Selected writings 
As author:
 Transnational Labour History. Explorations. Ashgate, Aldershot 2003, .
 Workers of the World. Essays toward a Global Labor History (Studies in global social history. Bd. 1). Brill, Leiden 2008, .
 Western Marxism and the Soviet Union. A Survey of Critical Theories and Debates since 1917. Haymarket, Chicago 2009, .
 Kriegsbegeisterung und mentale Kriegsvorbereitung. Interdisziplinäre Studien (Beiträge zur politischen Wissenschaft. Bd. 61). Duncker & Humblot, Berlin 1991, .

As editor:
 (with Jürgen Kocka) Capitalism: The Resurgence of a Historical Concept. London: Bloomsbury Academic, 2016. 
 (with Magaly Rodríguez García) On Coerced Labor: Work and Compulsion after Chattel Slavery. Leiden and Boston: Brill, 2016. 
 Humanitarian Intervention and Changing Labor Relations: Long-Term Consequences of the Abolition of the Slave Trade. Leiden and Boston: Brill Academic, 2011. 
 (with Eva Himmelstoss) Labour History Beyond Borders: Concepts and Explorations/ Grenzenüberschreitende Arbeitergeschichte: Konzepte und Erkundungen. Leipzig: Akademische Verlagsanstalt, 2010. 
 Grenzüberschreitende Arbeitergeschichte. Konzepte und Erkundungen. 45. Linzer Konferenz der „“, 10.–13. September 2009. Akademische VA, Leipzig 2010, .
 (with Karl Heinz Roth) Über Marx hinaus. Arbeitsgeschichte und Arbeitsbegriff in der Konfrontation mit den globalen Arbeitsverhältnissen des 21. Jahrhunderts. Assoziation A, Berlin 2009, .
 (with Angelika Ebbinghaus and Max Henninger) 1968 — A View of the Protest Movements 40 Years After, from a Global Perspective. Leipzig: Akademische Verlagsanstalt, 2009.
 (with Karl Heinz Roth and Max Henninger) Beyond Marx: Theorising the Global Labour Relations of the Twenty-First Century. Leiden: Brill, 2013. 
 (with Prabhu P. Mohapatra) Labour Matters: Towards Global Histories: Studies in Honour of Sabyasachi Bhattacharya. New Delhi: Tulika, 2009. 
 (with Jürgen Mittag and Berthold Unfried) Transnational Networks in the Twentieth Century: Ideas and Practices, Individuals and Organizations. Leipzig: Akademische Verlagsanstalt, 2008. 
 (with Rana P. Behal) India’s Labouring Poor: Historical Studies, c. 1600 - c. 2000. New Delhi: Foundation Books, 2007.

References

External links 
 Marcel van der Linden at the website of the International Institute for Social History

1952 births
Living people
Dutch social scientists
Social historians
University of Amsterdam alumni
Academic staff of the University of Amsterdam
Labor historians